Manuel Zeitz (born 1 August 1990) is a German professional footballer who plays as a midfielder for 1. FC Saarbrücken.

Club career
Zeitz was born in Völklingen. He joined 1. FC Saarbrücken in 2004, having previously played for SC Großrosseln, and made his debut for the club in the Oberliga Südwest during the 2008–09 season. Saarbrücken won the league this year, and promotion to the Regionalliga West, and Zeitz established himself as a key player, scoring 11 goals in 32 matches as the club won the title, and a second consecutive promotion. He has been an ever-present in Saarbrücken's first half-season in the 3. Liga, and was named as the best defensive midfielder in the league for this period by the magazine Kicker. He signed for 1. FC Nürnberg at the start of the 2011–12 season. After one season playing solely for the reserves, he first signed for SC Paderborn 07 on loan for one year, before signing a regular two-year contract until June 2015. In January 2014 he returned to Saarbrücken on loan for the remainder of the season, but was unable to prevent them being relegated from the 3. Liga. He then signed a two-year contract until June 2016 for Energie Cottbus, also in the 3. Liga.

International career
Zeitz has been capped twice for Germany's under-20 team, making his debut on 6 September 2010 against Switzerland.

Honours
Oberliga Südwest (V): 2009
Regionalliga West (IV): 2010

References

External links
 
 

1990 births
Living people
People from Völklingen
German footballers
Footballers from Saarland
Association football midfielders
Germany youth international footballers
2. Bundesliga players
3. Liga players
Regionalliga players
1. FC Saarbrücken players
1. FC Nürnberg players
1. FC Nürnberg II players
SC Paderborn 07 players
FC Energie Cottbus players
FC Energie Cottbus II players